Norfolk is a locality in Taranaki, in the North Island of New Zealand. It is located on State Highway 3, about 5.5 kilometres south-east of Inglewood and 10.5 km north-west of Midhirst.

Education
Norfolk School is a coeducational full primary (years 1–8) school with a roll of  students as of  The school celebrated its 125th jubilee in 2004.

Notes

New Plymouth District
Populated places in Taranaki